Monody is a 3-member synthpop / EBM / Futurepop band from the United States.

History
 Formed in 2006 in Portland, Oregon.

 In 2008, Monody released 4 debut singles entitled: 'Bound', 'Absent', 'Ceti Lullaby', and 'In Between'.

 On January 24 2008, Monody was featured in an Oregon Public Broadcasting segment on the construction in Portland, Oregon. Daniel Edgar (member) was recognized for using various construction sounds in a number of Monody songs. The song 'Beneath Andromeda' was featured in the segment. 

 Monody opened for Obscenity Trial (band) and Spetsnaz (band) at the Portland stop of their 2008 US tour on November 25, 2008.

 On March 8 2009, an interview with Monody was posted on the Portland music guide, Evy Metal. The interview covers topics such as their musical background, writing process, and live performances.

 Remote Music, the German electronic music label, announced that Monody joined their roster on July 3, 2009

 Monody contributed their "Irradiated Mix" remix of the song "In Between" on May 8 2012 to the  Electronic Saviors Volume 2 compilation released on Metropolis Records.

 On June 21 2015, 2 clips of Monody's songs were used in the "Beirut" episode of the show "Anthony Bourdain: Parts Unknown". The songs featured were "Ceti Lullaby" (at 30:18) and "Absent" (at 38:00) both from the "Of Iron and Clay" album.

 In celebration of the "Of Iron and Clay" album's 10th anniversary, on April 29 2021 Monody released an instrumental version of the album titled "Of Iron and Clay: Voiceless". This was a digital-only release, available for purchase or streaming on various platforms. 

 On October 10 2022, Monody announced that they joined the Distortion Productions label, and would be releasing a new EP. 

 On November 11 2022, Monody released their "Subtle Dissent EP". This release featured four new original songs, a cover of "The Boxer" by Simon and Garfunkel, and remixes by Eisfabrik and Particle Son. This was a digital-only release, available for purchase or streaming on various platforms.

Personnel

Current members
 Geoff Tripoli – lead vocals, lyrics
 David Battrick – drums, electronic percussion
 Daniel Edgar – synths, composition, engineering, production

Member Biographies

Geoff Tripoli 
Geoff comes from a musical background somewhat unlike the Monody sound. He started with piano lessons as a child and on to the electric guitar as a teenager.  He was a member of a couple rock bands over the years, but his true passion comes from building on his home studio and becoming a skilled engineer and producer of his own and other musicians' projects.  His ongoing side project, Entium, occasionally releases tracks that are on the electronica side of things. Geoff's vocal influences include artists like Dave Gahan, Jean-Luc De Meyer and Peter Murphy.

David Battrick
David has been a long-standing fixture in the Portland, Oregon music scene. He has been a past member of Monochrome, Written in Ashes, and Pharrah Phosphate. Notably, David spent 3 years studying percussion under the tutelage of Roger Allen (of the Portland Philharmonic fame).

Daniel Edgar
Daniel spent much of his early days growing up in a small Oregon town tinkering with drums, various noisemaking electronics, synthesizers and samplers. From an early age, he was inspired by European synthpop, 80s post-punk, and industrial music. Before Monody, Daniel spent time in several bands playing keyboards, bass, drums and most recently guitar.

Discography
 Of Iron and Clay LP (April 2011)
 Of Iron and Clay: Voiceless (Instrumental) LP (April 2021)
 Subtle Dissent EP (November 2022)

Singles
 Bound (February 2008)
 Ceti Lullaby (February 2008)
 Absent (February 2008)
 In Between (February 2008)
 Thanks to You (September 2008)
 The Crime (September 2008)
 Disremembered (September 2008)

Remixes
 The Highest Cost (Monodized) by Son of Rust on re:Cycled (May 2009)
 Über's Wasser Gehen (Monody Remix) by Obscenity Trial on Über's Wasser Gehen single (Special Edition) (July 2009)

References

External links
 Official Monody Site
 Monody on Ultimate Band List

American synth-pop groups
American electronic body music groups
Ableton Live users